The Robo Machines was a British comic serial which ran in Eagle from 10 November 1984 to 27 July 1985. Although it was titled after the Bandai-owned Robo Machine toyline, it primarily used the Tonka-owned names of the Gobots (which were later incorporated into Hasbro's Transformers). The characterizations, however, were original, and the plot wildly diverges from the American-made Challenge of the GoBots.

Background

In Europe, Bandai, rather than Tonka, distributed the action figures from the Robo Machine line, and with the Challenge of the Gobots cartoon yet to arrive in the UK, they engaged Fleetway Publishing to create a comic to help promote the line. Tom Tully, an experienced writer whose work included Roy of the Rovers and The Steel Claw, would script the series. The art was initially handled by Mario Capaldi, with Kim Raymond taking over midway through the first of the two arcs.

The comic was set in a different continuity to the Gobots cartoon, with the characters hailing from the planet Robotron, and some character names reflecting the European line (for example, the Renegade Twin Spin appeared as the Guardian Carry-All, and the Renegade Vamp was named Casmodon).

Storyline

First arc (10 November 1984 – 15 March 1985)

The first arc begins on Robotron, which is a planet in the Proxima System where the organic inhabitants are very scientifically advanced people who through cybernetics are now 99% machines themselves, and robots are used in every walk of life. There, a power-hungry scientist named "Stron-Domez the Master Renegade" has modified two criminal Robo Machines, Cy-Kill and Tank, so they can transform into vehicles. After an unsuccessful attempt to assassinate the President of Robotron, Stron-Domez takes his creations to Earth, which he had identified as being rich in minerals to build more transforming Robo Machines. The Robotron Guardian Security Forces dispatch Ex-El the Last Engineer and a group of volunteers in pursuit aboard the Command Centre. Ex-El has studied Stron-Domez's blueprints for Tank and Cy-Kill, and plans to modify his volunteers in the same fashion.

Meanwhile, Stron-Domez dispatches Cy-Kill, Tank and new creation Fitor to the town of Cholkham in East Anglia, England, which they begin to destroy. The Security Forces, in the shape of Ex-El's creations, which are Leader-1, Hans-Cuff and Dozer, arrive in time to drive them off, but the town has suffered many casualties, including the deaths of the parents of Charlie Bampton, a young boy who possesses ESP. This skill makes him useful to the Security Forces, and the chance to end Stron-Domez's threat gives Charlie a reason to help them.

After a botched contact with the British Army, the Security Forces track Stron-Domez to an electronics factory in Birmingham, where Stron-Domez has taken the workforce hostage and forced them to build more Robo Machines for him. The Security Force robot Truck and Charlie are able to free the humans, and the Security Forces move in and rout Stron-Domez' forces. Stron-Domez is able to escape on Cy-Kill when the police arrive on the scene, though all his other troops are captured and disabled by the Security Forces.

Second arc (29 March 1985 – 29 July 1985)

With most of his Robo Machines deactivated by the Security Forces, Stron-Domez experiments upon himself, and is able to modify his body so he becomes the massive robot Zod. This attracts the Security Forces, but Zod is able to attack the Command Centre, and force it into retreat. However, the Security Forces robot Carry-All accidentally tracks them to their junkyard base, only to be mortally wounded by Zod. At the junkyard, Zod and Cy-Kill have recruited a group of destitute humans to build them more Robo Machines – Zod's planned Devil Invaders. Carry-All's signals attract the Security Forces with just one Devil Invader, Casmodon, built. The Security Forces leave one of their numbers, Scooter, with Charlie on board the Command Centre, but the human has a premonition of great danger and persuades Scooter to follow them. The premonition is correct – the massive Casmodon is incredibly powerful, and in a pitched battle on the edge of London easily holds off the Security Forces attack, inflicting heavy losses on both them and the human population. Casmodon also captures Charlie, but while inside the Robo Machine, he is able to destroy vital circuitry, temporarily disabling his captor. The Security Forces then retreat to the Command Centre, and withdraw to Robotron to regroup, taking Charlie (whose parents were the only family he had, and thus has nothing to stay on Earth for) with them. Cy-Kill swears to build an army and invade the planet himself.

Ending

The serial was obviously curtailed before Tully had intended, as the ending, with Cy-Kill, Casmodon and Zod unopposed on Earth and the Security Forces in retreat, is highly unusual. It seems likely Zod or Cy-Kill would have built more Devil Machines (two more, Falgos and Zarios, are seen in Zod's vision in an episode midway through the second arc), and the Security Forces would have returned to Earth with reinforcements (most likely modelled on newer toys).

Inconsistencies

Several inconsistencies appear over the two arcs:
 Most glaringly, Ex-El, commander of the Security Forces in the first arc, simply disappears before the second arc begins.
 Similarly, Zod seems to disappear in the final few installments, with the focus switching to Cy-Kill and Casmodon.
 Several characters know each other's names without any possible reason – for example, Cy-Kill recognizes Carry-All in the junkyard, even though the script implies that Carry-All was only recently built on the Command Centre. However, it is also implied that the Robo Machines' robot modes looked the same on Robotron even before they were modified to transform (however illogical that may seem), as Cy-Kill and Leader-1 also recognize each other.

Characters

Security Force Robo Machines

 Leader-1 – acted as a field commander for the Security Forces, and then leader in the second arc. Powerful and fast. Turns into an F15 Eagle fighter jet.
 Dozer – a senior Security Force robot, he helped fight Stron-Domez' forces in Cholkham, and was injured in the battle with Casmodon. Turned into a bulldozer.
 Hans-Cuff – also involved in the battle at Cholkham, and soon afterwards befriended Charlie Bampton, much to the distaste of Ex-El. His protective feelings for the human also led to a disastrous contact with the human military. Turned into a police car.
 Rest-Q – the Security Forces medic, though he still participates on the attack on Casmodon. Turned into an ambulance.
 Truck – helped free Stron-Domez' captive workforce in Birmingham, but was seemingly destroyed battling Casmodon in London. Turned into a flatbed trailer truck.
 Night Ranger – fitted with silent running technology, Night Ranger infiltrated Stron-Domez' factory in Birmingham, but was destroyed in the battle with Casmodon in London. Turned into a Harley Davidson Electra Glide motorcycle.
 Turbo – a brave, loyal Robo Machine, he was involved in the battle with Casmodon, and his persistent efforts enabled him to save Dozer. Turned into a sports car.
 Scooter – the Security Forces' courier, Scooter was weak but courageous, and followed Leader-1's forces into battle in London despite being ordered to stay behind with Charlie. Transforms into a scooter.
 Carry-All – A capable fighter, Carry-All was dispatched with Royal-T to fend off Zod when the Command Centre was attacked. He accidentally came across Cy-Kill and Zod while trying to re-establish contact with the Command Centre, and was mortally wounded by Zod. However, he was able to signal the Security Forces before dying. Transforms into a CH-46 Sea Knight helicopter.
 Royal-T – Along with Carry-All, Royal-T attempted to intercept Zod over London, but was shot down. Badly wounded, he was helped to safety by Carry-All, but presumably expired when his comrade was killed before he could return with a fresh fuel supply.

Renegade Robo Machines

 Zod – In the shooting down Royal-T, and later killing Carry-All. Zod still possessed the intellect of Stron-Domez, and was able to design the Devil Invaders, and oversee construction of the first, Casmodon. However, soon after his stabilizers were disabled after being attacked by the Security Forces, and Cy-Kill abandoned him.
 Cy-Kill – a petty criminal chosen by Stron-Domez for his experiments, Cy-Kill's ambitions quickly grew, and by the end of the second arc, he seemed to have struck out on his own, choosing to help Casmodon battle the Security Forces in London rather than attend to the damaged Zod. The only one of Stron-Domez' original creations to avoid capture at the end of the first arc. Turned into a motorcycle.
 Tank – another petty criminal recruited and converted by Stron-Domez, Tank was rather stupid, for instance being tricked by a human into battling Cy-Kill in Cholkham. He was subsequently injured in a skirmish with the Security Forces outside the town, and then again at the Birmingham factory, courtesy of Night Ranger. He was then captured and deactivated by the Security Forces. Presumably his body remains in the Command Centre. Turned into a battle tank.
 Fitor – created by Stron-Domez on the journey to Earth, he participated in the attack on Cholkham, but was captured and deactivated after the battle in Birmingham. Presumably, his body remains in the Command Centre. Turned into a jet fighter.
 Cop-Tur – created on Earth by Stron-Domez, and aided in the capture of the factory in Birmingham. Soon afterwards he was captured and deactivated by the Security Forces. Presumably his body remains in the Command Centre. Turned into a helicopter.
 Loco – the only Robo Machine Stron-Domez was able to build in Birmingham before the Security Forces arrived, Loco suffered two defeats from Truck in his short life before he was captured and deactivated. Presumably, his body remains in the Command Centre. Turned into a steam train.
 Casmodon – the first Devil Invader built by Zod, and the only one completed. Casmodon was the biggest Robo Machine yet, and possessed a huge amount of power. He took on most of the Security Forces on the outskirts of London, destroying Night Ranger and (probably) Truck, injuring Dozer and forcing them to withdraw. However, he could not follow them as Charlie had disabled some of his circuits. Turned into a flying car.

References

External links
 Robo Machines Comic at Counter-X.net 

Eagle comic strips
British comics
Eagle (comic) characters
Fictional robots
Transformers comics